César López Giraldo (born 1973) is a classically trained musician, composer, producer guitarist and pianist from Bogota, Colombia. In 2003, López founded the Battalion of Immediate Artistic Reaction which involves various musicians and activists seeking alternatives to the ever-present violence that has plagued Colombia over many years. The group mainly concentrates its efforts on the capital city of Bogotá. When advised, the group is widely known to immediately convene together to play for the victims directly impacted by the violence within the country.

Cesar Lopez is officially a 'Non Violence Messenger' of the United Nations and an 'Emissary of Consciousness' for Amnesty International.

López is the creator of the Escopetarra, a largely symbolic musical instrument which is an AK-47 converted into a guitar.

Escopetarra 

López's most well-known achievement is the Escopetarra, which are decommissioned AK-47s converted into guitars. So far, only a few dozen of these guitars have been produced, but upon completion, López intends to give the guitars to high-profile musicians across the world, such as Juanes, Fito Páez, Bob Geldof and Manu Chao, and to political and religious leaders such as  Kofi Annan.

References

External links

, Cesar Lopez official website.
DeltaRecords.net, The escopetarra: a guitar with a violent background
TodaBalaEsperdida.com, Cesar Lopez TODA BALA ES PERDIDA' website.
@CesarLopezMusic , Cesar Lopez' Twitter.
Killer Sound, Kevin Sites, Yahoo! News, 24 April 2006
Colombian musicians organise online, BBC News, 1 June 2006

1973 births
Living people
Colombian musicians
Colombian activists
Colombian pianists
21st-century pianists